Ruidera is a municipality located in the province of Ciudad Real, Castile-La Mancha, Spain. It has a population of 596.

It is located close to the Lagunas de Ruidera natural lakes.

Municipalities in the Province of Ciudad Real